Christian Saceanu was the defending champion but lost in the second round to Brad Drewett.

Eric Jelen won in the final 6–4, 3–6, 7–5 against Nick Brown.

Seeds

  Derrick Rostagno (quarterfinals)
  Richard Matuszewski (semifinals)
  Omar Camporese (first round)
  Eric Jelen (champion)
  Pieter Aldrich (second round)
  Kelly Evernden (quarterfinals)
  Michiel Schapers (semifinals)
  Todd Witsken (first round)

Draw

Finals

Top half

Bottom half

External links
 1989 Bristol Open draw

Singles